The Boydton Historic District is a national historic district located at Boydton, Mecklenburg County, Virginia. It encompasses 199 contributing buildings, 6 contributing sites, 6 contributing structure, and 2 contributing objects in the central business district and surrounding residential areas of the town of Boydton.  Notable buildings include the municipal building (1905), the old jail (1870), the Beales, Bedinger, and
Gregory, Inc. car dealership building (1918), Washington Tavern, Williams and Goode Bank (1908), Boydton Department Store (1935), Mecklenburg County Building Department (1949), Southside Regional Library (1939), Presbyterian Meeting House (1819), Saint James Episcopal Church (1840-1841), Boydton Baptist Church, Trinity Episcopal Church (1890s), "Cedar Crest" (1825), and "On the Hill" (1920), which was separately listed in 2015.  Also located in the district and separately listed are the Boyd's Tavern and Mecklenburg County Courthouse.

It was listed on the National Register of Historic Places in 2002.

References

Historic districts on the National Register of Historic Places in Virginia
Federal architecture in Virginia
Greek Revival architecture in Virginia
Buildings and structures in Mecklenburg County, Virginia
National Register of Historic Places in Mecklenburg County, Virginia